Aspasma minima is a species of clingfish found in the Pacific Ocean near the shores of southern Japan. This species is the only species in the monotypic genus Aspasma. This species was described in 1887 by the German zoologist and paleontologist Ludwig Heinrich Philipp Döderlein from a type collected at a depth of 100-150 fathoms in Sagami Bay, Japan.

References

Gobiesocidae
Monotypic fish genera
Fish of Japan
Taxa named by David Starr Jordan
Taxa named by Henry Weed Fowler